The rufous-vented chachalaca (Ortalis ruficauda) is a member of an ancient group of birds of the family Cracidae, which are related to the Australasian mound builders. It inhabits northeast Colombia and northern Venezuela where it is called guacharaca, and the island of Tobago in Trinidad and Tobago where it is known as the cocrico and is one of the country's two national birds (being featured on the country's coat of arms). It is also found on Bequia and Union Island in the Grenadines where it may have been introduced.

Habitat
The rufous-vented chachalaca is a largely arboreal species found in forest and woodland, but it is also found in more open dry scrubby areas. This combined with relatively low hunting pressure, make it far less vulnerable than larger members of the family, notably curassows.

Description
These are medium-sized birds, similar in general appearance to turkeys, with small heads, long strong legs and a long broad tail. They are typically 53–58 cm long; the female weighs 540g and the larger male 640g. They have fairly dull plumage, dark brown above and paler below. The head is grey, and the brown tail is tipped rufous or white depending on race.

Call
As other chachalacas, the rufous-vented chachalaca is a very noisy species, preferring to execute their vocal feats at dawn. The male's call is a loud low ka-ka-rooki-rooki-ka, answered by the female's high-pitched watch-a-lak, which they often repeat several times in a row, in precise synchronization.

Breeding and behaviour
The species is a social bird, often seen in family groups. It walks along branches seeking the fruit (such as mangoes, berries and those from the Euterpe palm), leaves and seeds on which it feeds. It is an able flyer that can even take off and fly vertically, but does not usually fly long distances. The twig nest is built low in a tree, and three or four large white eggs are laid. The female incubates them alone.

Subspecies

There are two subspecies:
 O. r. ruficauda (Jardine, 1847) - northeast Colombia to northern Venezuela, also Tobago and Isla Margarita
 O. r. ruficrissa (Sclater and Salvin, 1870) - northern Colombia and northwest Venezuela

References 

Evans, Peter (1990). Birds of the Eastern Caribbean. Macmillan, 

 Hilty, Steven L (2003). Birds of Venezuela. London: Christopher Helm.

External links
Stamps (for Trinidad and Tobago, Venezuela)
Rufous-vented Chachalaca videos on the Internet Bird Collection
Rufous-vented Chachalaca photo gallery VIREO

rufous-vented chachalaca
Birds of Venezuela
Birds of Trinidad and Tobago
Birds of the Caribbean
Birds of Saint Vincent and the Grenadines
National symbols of Trinidad and Tobago
rufous-vented chachalaca
Birds of Colombia